Edmond Was a Donkey is a Canadian-French animated short film, directed by Franck Dion and released in 2012.
The film tells the story of Edmond, an unhappy office worker who discovers his true nature after his coworkers play a prank that involves forcing him to wear donkey ears.

Plot 
Edmond carries on with his daily routine.
He is busy with going to work and living a lackluster marriage.

Obviously not knowing, however, how to defend himself a couple colleagues at work play a few pranks on him.
Sneaking up to him they gently place a pair of donkey ears made out of newspaper upon his head.
Once Edmond turns to a mirror he is startled by seeing a full-grown donkey instead of himself.
He does realize, though, removing the pair of paper donkey ears makes him “incomplete” again, just the Nobody he is and was at work.
Nevertheless, he decides to wear the donkey ears from now on, reinforcing colleagues’ beliefs he was mentally ill.
His wife initially thinks it was just a funny, temporary quirk of his, but things get serious as Edmond obtains a tailor-made pair donkey ears made out textiles, including a proper strap for securing the headpiece under his chin.

Seeking company to other donkeys Edmond breaks in into a donkey enclosure in a zoo at night.
The following morning he is apprehended and subsequently admitted to a mental hospital.
Being subject to electroconvulsive therapy Edmond is forced to learn that he is not a donkey.
The treatment seems to be successful:
Edmond does not need to wear donkey ears anymore.

His former superior, always having been impressed of his dedication and efficiency, sticks up for him and ensures he can regain his former position at work.
On the way to his workplace, however, he relapses, hallucinating the presence of a fellow inpatient who believes to be a chicken and eventually even flies.
In the subway station the crowds, dubbed with the sound of running horses, stampedes Edmond.
Having returned to his familiar workplace, alone in the archives, Edmond hastily assembles a pair of paper donkey ears again and puts them on, ultimately giving him relief.
Knowing he will not be accepted by others (the “horses”) as a donkey, he commits suicide by being crushed between two motorized shelves.

The movie concludes with a donkey peacefully standing on a meadow in the wild.

Style 
Edmond is of small stature, in a world of, with regard to proportions, normal-sized people.
The only other small person seems to be a fellow patient at the asylum who apparently believes to be a chicken.

Throughout the entire movie Edmond does not say a single word, but communicates through universally understood gestures or looks.
There are no mature dialogs, but the voices of staff, Edmond’s superior, his wife, continually comment on the depicted action as the narration progresses.

Most shots are static.
The occasional pan, brief tracking shot, or zoom are rare exceptions, the first day of work with Edmond’s new tailor-made set of donkey ears, however, is established with a dynamic first person shot capturing staff’s disbelieving reactions.

All colors were kept low key.
At work everything is in dull gray tones.
The entire staff has dark hair or is bald.
Edmond’s fantasies, however, and people appreciating his dreams show a broader range of colors, without being too flamboyant, leave alone being cartoonish caricatures.

In the living room of Edmond and his wife a small portrait photo of MLK Jr. hangs on the wall, a reference to ostracism as a topic and the struggle of overcoming it.

Production 
The film’s French voice cast included Bérangère Bonvoisin, Benoist Brione, Gaëtan Gallier and Patrick Bouchitey, while its English voice cast included Kathleen Fee, Richard Dumont, Kent McQuaid and Daniel Brochu.

Awards 
The film won the Bravo!FACT Award for Best Canadian Short Film at the 2012 CFC Worldwide Short Film Festival.
It was a Canadian Screen Award nominee for Best Animated Short Film at the 1st Canadian Screen Awards, and a César Award nominee for Best Animated Film at the 38th César Awards.

References

External links 
 Edmond Was a Donkey at the National Film Board of Canada
 
 
 

2012 short films
2012 films
2012 animated films
Canadian animated short films
French animated short films
National Film Board of Canada animated short films
2010s Canadian films
2010s French films